The 2014–15 Honduran Liga Nacional season was the 49th Honduran Liga Nacional edition, since its establishment in 1965.  For this season, the system format remained the same as the previous season.  The tournament began on 1 August 2014 and has ended in May 2015. On 20 December 2014, C.D. Motagua obtained its 13th national title after defeating C.D. Real Sociedad 2–1 on aggregate in the Apertura finals.

2014–15 teams

A total of 10 teams will contest the tournament, including 9 sides from the 2013–14 season plus C.D. Honduras Progreso, promoted from the 2013–14 Liga de Ascenso.  Parrillas One moved from Tela to Siguatepeque.

Apertura

Regular season
Real C.D. España managed to clinch the first position after drawing 1–1 at C.D. Victoria on the last round.  It was the 9th time in history that the Aurinegros came up as the regular season winners.  One curious fact occurred between C.D. Motagua and Real España where they both achieve a 5–0 home win over each other, breaking their respective record as the largest victory against each other.  C.D. Victoria finished last for the fifth time in history.

Standings

Results
 As of 15 November 2014

 Real Sociedad 3–0 Marathón on forfeit.  Original score 1–1 abandoned at 88' due to Marathón not accepting a late penalty.

Postseason

Playoffs

Semifinals

Final

Clausura

Regular season

Standings

Results
 As of 2 May 2015

Postseason

Playoffs

Semifinals

Final

Top goalscorers
 As of 24 May 2015
 29 goals:

  Román Castillo (Motagua)

 25 goals:

  Anthony Lozano (Olimpia)

 19 goals:

  Erick Andino (Victoria)

 18 goals:

  Claudio Cardozo (Real España)

 17 goals:

  Carlos Discua (Motagua)

 16 goals:

  Iván López (Parrillas One)
  Romell Quioto (Olimpia)
  Lucas Gómez (Motagua)

 14 goals:

  Eddie Hernández (Vida)
  Ángel Tejeda (Honduras Progreso)
  Juan Rodríguez (Parrillas One)

 11 goals:

  Julio de León (Platense)

 10 goals:

  Juan Ocampo (Honduras Progreso)

 8 goals:

  Bryan Róchez (Real España)
  Roberto Riascos (Vida)
  Mario Abadía (Platense)
  Diego Reyes (Marathón)
  Melvin Valladares (Victoria)

 7 goals:

  Jorge Zaldívar (Honduras Progreso)
  Javier Estupiñán (Olimpia)
  Osman Melgares (Real Sociedad)
  Charles Córdoba (Marathón)

 6 goals:

  Rony Martínez (Real Sociedad)
  Alberth Elis (Olimpia)
  José Tobías (Real Sociedad)

 5 goals:

  Rony Flores (Real España / Platense)
  Félix Crisanto (Victoria)
  Sergio Mendoza (Real España)
  Henry Clark (Real Sociedad)
  Cholby Martínez (Vida)
  Mario Berríos (Marathón)

 4 goals:

  Edwin León (Honduras Progreso)
  Carlos Bernárdez (Victoria)
  Júnior Izaguirre (Motagua)
  Edder Delgado (Real España)
  Luis Lobo (Real España / Honduras Progreso)
  Fábio de Souza (Olimpia)
  Christian Martínez (Marathón)
  Darwin Bermúdez (Parrillas One)
  Bryan Acosta (Real España)
  Jorge Cardona (Honduras Progreso)
  Miguel Valerio (Vida)
  Luis Alvarado (Honduras Progreso)
  Nery Medina (Victoria)

 3 goals:

  Omar Guerra (Olimpia)
  Víctor Ortiz (Vida)
  Jerrick Díaz (Platense)
  Reynaldo Tilguath (Vida)
  Jocimar Moreira (Parrillas One)
  Juan Mejía (Real España)
  Israel Silva (Motagua)
  Henry Bermúdez (Victoria)
  Alexander Aguilar (Platense)
  Jesús Canales (Vida)
  Jairo Puerto (Marathón)
  Walter Martínez (Marathón)
  Juan Munguía (Real Sociedad)
  Allan Lalín (Platense)
  Henry Martínez (Real Sociedad)
  Leonardo Isaula (Honduras Progreso)
  Aly Arriola (Honduras Progreso)
  Julio Rodríguez (Real España)
  Elkin González (Real Sociedad)
  Franklyn Morales (Honduras Progreso)

 2 goals:

  Bayron Méndez (Olimpia)
  Wilmer Crisanto (Motagua)
  Devron García (Victoria)
  Christian Altamirano (Platense)
  Cristian Lara (Platense)
  Johnny Barrios (Marathón)
  Ramiro Bruschi (Real España)
  Leandro Guaita (Vida)
  Franco Güity (Victoria)
  Walter Castro (Platense)
  Christopher Anariba (Honduras Progreso)
  Ramón Núñez (Real España)
  César Zelaya (Real Sociedad)
  Carlos Solórzano (Parrillas One)
  Lesther Zavala (Parrillas One)
  Pablo Arzú (Real Sociedad)
  Luis Guzmán (Honduras Progreso)
  Rigoberto Padilla (Victoria)
  Víctor Moncada (Honduras Progreso)
  Osman Chávez (Platense)
  Mario Martínez (Real España)
  Melvin Batiz (Real Sociedad)
  Marco Vega (Marathón)
  Mario Leguizamón (Olimpia)
  Fredixon Elvir (Olimpia)
  Douglas Martínez (Vida)
  Óscar Bonilla (Marathón)
  Juan Romero (Parrillas One)
  Omar Elvir (Motagua)
  Ian Osorio (Platense)
  Pastor Martínez (Honduras Progreso)
  Chestyn Onofre (Vida)
  Julio Bernárdez (Parrillas One)
  Pedro Mencía (Honduras Progreso)
  Víctor Núñez (Real España)

 1 goal:

  Dílmer Gutiérrez (Real Sociedad)
  Níxon Duarte (Platense)
  Jhow Benavídez (Real España)
  Juan Rial (Marathón)
  Jorge Bengoché (Olimpia)
  Reinieri Mayorquín (Motagua)
  Wesley Braz (Marathón)
  Elroy Smith (Platense)
  Henry Figueroa (Motagua)
  Hárlinton Gutiérrez (Real España)
  Nelson Álvarez (Parrillas One)
  Carlos Mejía (Olimpia)
  Arnulfo Beitar (Parrillas One)
  Ronaldo Barbosa (Vida)
  Ricardo Rosales (Motagua)
  Ever Alvarado (Olimpia)
  Johnny Leverón (Marathón)
  Clayvin Zúniga (Real Sociedad)
  Maynor Gómez (Parrillas One)
  Mariano Acevedo (Olimpia)
  David Meza (Olimpia)
  Marcelo Espinal (Vida)
  Darixon Vuelto (Victoria)
  Odis Borjas (Platense)
  Bryan Johnson (Olimpia)
  Sergio Zelaya (Real Sociedad)
  Carlos Palacios (Marathón)
  Joshua Vargas (Platense)
  Walter Hernández (Platense)
  Jeffri Flores (Real España)
  Andrés Copete (Parrillas One)
  German Mejía (Olimpia)
  Wilmer Fuentes (Marathón)
  Gerson Rodas (Real España)
  Kevin López (Motagua)
  Néstor Martínez (Olimpia)
  John Suazo (Marathón)
  Camilo Aguirre (Real España)
  Francisco Benítez (Honduras Progreso)
  Romário Pinto (Marathón)
  Johny Gómez (Parrillas One)
  Irvin Reyna (Motagua)
  Carlos Sánchez (Honduras Progreso)
  Marcelo Santos (Vida)
  Jefferson Bernárdez (Parrillas One)
  Ozzie Bodden (Real Sociedad)
  David Carranza (Real Sociedad)
  Johnny Palacios (Olimpia)
  Franco Tisera (Victoria)
  Dicktmar Hernández (Victoria)
  Víctor Zúniga (Honduras Progreso)

 1 own goal:

  Henry Figueroa (Motagua)
  Romell Quioto (Olimpia)
  Robbie Matute (Real Sociedad)
  Mauricio Sabillón (Marathón)
  Quiarol Arzú (Platense)

 2 own goals:

  Leonardo Domínguez (Victoria)

Aggregate table
Relegation is determined by the aggregated table of both Apertura and Clausura tournaments.  On 19 April 2015, Parrillas One was relegated to Liga de Ascenso after drawing 2–2 at home against C.D. Real Sociedad.

References

External links
 LNP Official

Liga Nacional de Fútbol Profesional de Honduras seasons
1
Honduras